Eli Whitney Technical High School, or Whitney Tech, is a technical high school located in Hamden, Connecticut, which receives students from many nearby towns. Eli Whitney Tech is part of the Connecticut Technical High School System.

Technologies
In addition to a complete academic program leading to a high school diploma, students attending Whitney Tech receive training in one of the following trades and technologies:

Automotive Technology
Carpentry
Computer-Aided Drafting and Design
Culinary Arts
Electrical
Graphics Technology
Hairdressing
Health Technology
Manufacturing Technology
Marketing, Management and Entrepreneurship
Plumbing and Heating

References

External links
 

Buildings and structures in Hamden, Connecticut
Schools in New Haven County, Connecticut
Educational institutions established in 1956
Public high schools in Connecticut
Educational institutions accredited by the Council on Occupational Education
1956 establishments in Connecticut